Międzylesie  is a small village in the administrative district of Gmina Stara Kamienica, within Karkonosze County, Lower Silesian Voivodeship, in south-western Poland. The hamlet belongs to the village of Kopaniec (prior Seifershau). Prior to 1945 it was in Germany, and was known as Ramrich or Kolonie Ramberg.

The village was founded around a mill on the river Kamienica (Kemnitz) at the foot of the Trzciniak mountain (Ramberg). In the first half of the 18th century a hunter's house was located here in the property of the Schaffgotsch family. Later a mill was built by the Schaffgotsch family as well as a settlement. Near the mill was a famous restaurant called Die Rambergschenke. In 1978 there were six farms in Międzylesie. In 2008 there were four houses – one of them houses the Nemoland international cultural centre.

External links
 Nemoland

Villages in Karkonosze County